The Stadler Euro Dual (known as the Vossloh Euro Dual until 2015) is a series of dual power, electro-diesel locomotive by Stadler Rail Valencia. Unlike traditional dual mode locomotives, fitted with relatively low-powered diesel engines for 'last mile' movements only, vehicles are typically furnished with power units more comparable to that of mainline diesel locomotives.

The Euro Dual series was launched by Vossloh during 2012, it shares a considerably large portion of its design with the single power Euro Light family of locomotives. Being customisable to meet customer demands, various sized powerplants can be fitted to the type; it can also be configured as a tri mode vehicle via the installation of a battery pack. To date, there are three distinct versions of the Euro Dual that have seen customer use; the UKDual for the United Kingdom, the PrasaDual for South Africa and an unbranded series for Germany. By late 2019, a total of 30 locomotives had been constructed, while a total of 74 Euro Duals were reportedly on the company's books.

Background
At Innotrans 2012, Vossloh announced the launch of its range of dual mode locomotives; the company's initial offerings included the DM30 based on the Vossloh DE 18, and the EuroDual locomotives derived from its diesel Euro 4000 and EuroLight classes. Specifically, the Euro Dual shares the majority of its design, including elements such as the bodyshell, braking systems, bogies, traction equipment and software, with the Eurolight series. Subsequent orders differed from the initial specifications, with orders from the UK and South Africa being for Bo-Bo locomotives. At Innotrans 2018, the new Eurodual was presented by Stadler; the first two versions are marketed as UKDual and PrasaDual, while a third variant of the EuroDual featured the Co-Co wheel arrangement.

In comparison to historic dual mode locomotives, the Euro Dual series was not designed with a low-powered diesel powerplant intended only for 'last mile' operations with restrictive acceleration, speed, and range; rather, it was a full capable locomotive in either diesel or electric modes. It has been designed for routinely handling heavy freight consists, the series is reportedly expected to function as a dual-mode replacement for the successful Euro 4000, which will soon cease production as the latter is not compliant with European Stage IIIA emission standards. The market for dual mode trains is seen to be a growing one in comparison to conventional single mode diesel locomotives; by 2019, relatively few pure diesel locomotives were reportedly achieving sales.

The Euro Dual was designed from the onset as a highly modular platform, allowing it to be offered to customers in various different configurations, covering various gauges and voltage systems. Accordingly, it can be equipped with diesel engines of various power ratings, being determined by the requirements of each specific customer. Despite this customisability, many features such as the bodyshell are capable of accommodating such range with little meaningful modifications. Furthermore, some versions of the Euro Dual series are tri modes, which are capable of being powered by either overhead electrification, a diesel engine, or an array of batteries. When fitted with a battery unit, the starting power of the locomotive can be augmented beyond conventional limits, enabling trains to accelerate faster by augmenting the starting tractive effort of the diesel engine to around 500kN. Another advantage of such a configuration is the ability to recover energy via regenerative braking, improving operational efficiency.

Orders

United Kingdom

Direct Rail Services

In September 2013, UK rail operator Direct Rail Services announced it had ordered ten Euro Dual locomotives, with a  engine, and 4MW rating electrical equipment (25kV AC operation). The type was subsequently designated as the Class88. The design is a development of the Class 68 (Stadler UKLight) diesel locomotives that Direct Rail Services introduced in 2014, having the bodyshell, cab, brakes, bogies, traction equipment and control software in common, the diesel engine is a  Caterpillar C27, albeit a model that conforms with the European IIIB emissions standards unlike that of the Class 68.

In April 2016, one vehicle was transferred to the Velim railway test circuit for testing.

Rail Operations Group

In January 2021, Rail Operations Group confirmed their order of 30 Class 93 locomotives, with the first ten deliveries scheduled for 2023. Unlike the earlier Class 88, these shall be tri mode vehicles furnished with a battery pack, enabling operations away from overhead catenary wires without activating the diesel engine.

GB Railfreight 
On 29 April 2022, GB Railfreight announced an order for 30 new Class 99 locomotives, financed by Beacon Rail.

France
Following its use in manufacturer trials, the prototype Euro Dual was put up for sale. French operator VFLI purchased this locomotive, had it furnished with French-specific safety apparatus, and has put it into use.

South Africa
In October 2013, Swifambo Rail Leasing placed a €250million order for 50 Euro Dual and 20 Euro 4000 diesel locomotives, to be leased to the Passenger Rail Agency of South Africa (PRASA) for use on Shosholoza Meyl services.

During late 2015, PRASA began proceedings in the High Court of South Africa to terminate the contract for both the Afro4000 and Euro-Dual locomotives ordered from Vossloh, and to be repaid the R2.65billion already expended. A specific problem cited was that the supplied diesel locomotives were substantially out of gauge for parts of the network, being 4.14m high, as opposed to a 3.965m limit specified by the government infrastructure and logistics organisation Transnet. PRASA also claimed that Swifambo lacked the necessary experience, and or certification to be awarded the contract, and that Swifambo had failed to meet the terms of the bidding process, in that it lacked experience in the supply of railway equipment.

Germany 
In 2017, private German operator Havelländische Eisenbahnen (HVLE) ordered ten Euro Dual locomotives and a further option of ten. Through this order, HVLE became the launch customer for the Euro Dual. The variant  features AC traction motors and separate IGBT converters for each axle. The diesel engine is a CAT C175-16 rated at 2800kW (Stage IIIB compliant). The construction is fully TSI compliant. It features the latest ETCS Baseline3 train protection system and legacy PZB for the German network. During 2018, the first three locomotives were delivered and begun the homologation process. During May 2020, it was announced that commercial use of HVLE's Euro Dual fleet had commenced.

Shortly thereafter, a major order for 30 Euro Duals, accompanied by options for 70 more, was placed by the Swiss rolling stock leasing company European Loc Pool. The first batch of ten locomotives are to be all configured for use in Germany and shall only initially be certified for use in Germany, although there are plans to seek approval for operations in other countries, including Norway and Sweden.

During late 2018, another operator, placed an order for ten Euro Duals configured for use on the German railways.

Bolivia
Bolivian operator, Ferroviaria Andina ordered three Stadler SALi (South American Light Loco) locomotives derived from Euro Dual design and adapted for Bolivian metre-gauge railway, in February 2018.

Tanzania
Tanzania Railways Corporation ordered six Euro Dual locomotives for Tanzania Standard Gauge Railway in January 2020.

Turkey
In 2019, the Turkish open access operator Körfez Ulaştırma ordered seven locomotives; these are intended for 2,000tonne oil trains in Turkey. In addition to supplying the Euro Duals themselves, Stadler is also to contracted perform all maintenance activities upon the fleet.

See also
 Stadler Eurolight - a similar Diesel locomotive

References

External links

Macosa/Meinfesa/Vossloh Espana locomotives
Electro-diesel locomotives of South Africa
Electro-diesel locomotives of Great Britain
Standard gauge railway locomotives
Railway locomotives introduced in 2012